Alkemstone is a puzzle video game published by Level-10 (a division of Dakin 5) for the Apple II in 1981. It is a puzzle in a dungeon which the character explores to determine the location of the Alkemstone.

Prize
The Alkemstone was hidden in the real world and the publisher offered a $5000 reward for the first person to decipher its location. It was likely inspired by the popularity of the Masquerade armchair treasure hunt published in 1979 and still unsolved at the time of Alkemstone's release.

The reward was increased to $7500 in 1982. The prize was never awarded and it is unknown if anyone solved the clues or recovered the Alkemstone from the location it was hidden.

Gameplay
The dungeon size is 32 rooms wide x 16 rooms deep, however some clues appear intermittently and therefore rooms must be carefully inspected over many visits.

Reception
Forrest Johnson reviewed Alkemstone in The Space Gamer No. 48. Johnson commented that "Don't buy this one unless you seriously intend to win the five thou and have a high tolerance for boredom."

Reviews
Interface Age

References

External links
Alkemstone manual
MobyGames entry

1981 video games
Apple II games
Apple II-only games
Level-10 games
Maze games
Puzzle video games
Video games developed in the United States